On Golden Pond is a 2001 American live television adaptation of the play of the same name starring Julie Andrews and Christopher Plummer. The movie originally aired on CBS on April 29, 2001 and was filmed on a sound stage at CBS Television City in Los Angeles, California.

Julie Andrews and Christopher Plummer had previously starred in the highly successful 1965 film The Sound of Music, and their reuniting in this play was part of the promotion for the original broadcast of the film. The film is also notable because the author of the play, Ernest Thompson, directed this version, and Craig Anderson, the producer/director of the original Off Broadway and Broadway productions of the play, was the executive producer. For Andrews, the film marked the first instance of public singing, albeit only a few notes, since throat surgery ruined her singing voice in 1995.

Thompson provided rewrites to his original play for this broadcast. Most of the revisions are to Act II and center on the characters of Bill Ray and Charlie Martin.

Approximately 11.9 million people watched the production when it was initially released, the lowest viewership for a program in its time slot.

Cast list 
 Julie Andrews as Ethel Thayer
 Christopher Plummer as Norman Thayer
 Glenne Headly as Chelsea Thayer Wayne
 Sam Robards as Bill Ray
 Brett Cullen as Charlie Martin
 Will Rothhaar as Billy Ray Jr.

Plot 
For an approximate plot and synopsis, see On Golden Pond (1981 film) and On Golden Pond (play), respectively.

Awards and nominations

Emmy Awards
 Nomination for Outstanding Art Direction for a Miniseries, Movie or a Special (2001)

See also
 On Golden Pond (play)
 On Golden Pond (1981 movie)

References

External links
 
 Movie on YouTube
 Variety Review
 LA Times article
 YouTube video of part 1

2001 television films
2001 films
Films set in New Hampshire
Films about dysfunctional families
Films about old age
Films about vacationing
Films shot in California
Films shot in Los Angeles
CBS network films
Television remakes of films
American live television shows
Films scored by Anthony Marinelli
American films based on plays
Films directed by Ernest Thompson